The ASA Midwest Tour (until 2022: ARCA Midwest Tour) is a pavement Super Late Model auto racing series based in the Midwestern United States with its headquarters in Oregon, Wisconsin. It was a developmental series of the Automobile Racing Club of America (ARCA), and currently of the American Speed Association, along with the CRA Super Series.

History 

The series can trace its roots back to the ARTGO series which was formed in 1975. NASCAR sanctioned the tour from 1998 until 2006. During that time, it was known as the RE/MAX Challenge Series, International Truck & Engine Midwest Series and finally the NASCAR AutoZone Elite Division, Midwest Series. NASCAR discontinued the series in 2006 as car counts dwindled.

Tim Olson and Stephen Einhaus formed Cars and Stars Promotions in 2006 to begin a separate series that replaced the defunct ARTGO/NASCAR series. It was sanctioned by the American Speed Association (ASA) and was known as the ASA Midwest Tour. ARCA took over sanctioning the series in 2013 when it began to be known as the ARCA Midwest Tour. Tim Olson, President of the ARCA Midwest Tour, announced that he has sold the ownership of the ARCA Midwest Tour to former Big 8 series director and Rockford Speedway general manager Gregg McKarns. The purchase of ARCA by NASCAR on April 27, 2018 indirectly reunited the series with the series' former sanctioning body. Bob Sargent's Track Enterprises announced to purchase the ARCA Midwest Tour from McKarns at the end of 2022, and rebranded it the ASA Midwest Tour.

Drivers 

The series has its "Touring Stars" program, which recognizes the top drivers committed to racing the whole schedule. The "Touring Stars" are featured throughout the year on posters and event fliers promoting the series, as well as are eligible for pay bonuses at each race.

There have also been many NASCAR stars that have made appearances in the ASA Midwest Tour, such as Aric Almirola, David Ragan, David Stremme, Rusty Wallace, Tony Stewart, Kelly Bires, Kevin Harvick, Landon Cassill, Matt Kenseth, Jeff Green, Ron Hornaday Jr., Kyle Busch, Travis Kvapil, Todd Kluever, Johnny Sauter, Erik Darnell, Scott Wimmer, Ken Schrader, Tim Sauter, Jay Sauter, Dick Trickle, Natalie Decker, Rich Bickle and William Byron.

Seasons

2022 season

Rookie of the Year

Tracks 

The series has raced at 23 different race tracks, mainly in the Upper Midwest:

References

External links 
ARCA Midwest Tour
ARCA Midwest Tour at The Third Turn

Stock car racing series in the United States
Automobile Racing Club of America
Stock car racing series
Auto racing series in the United States